Yourself or Someone Like You is the debut album by American rock band Matchbox 20. It was released on October 1, 1996, by Lava Records and Atlantic Records.

Composition and release
The album features a sound similar to traditional rock and post-grunge. The album features themes of adolescence, adultery, loneliness, domestic violence, psychological abuse, humiliation, depression, anger, and alcoholism.

According to Rob Thomas, the album's title was originally to be Woodshed Diaries. However, that changed when Thomas and Paul Doucette were at a woman's musical performance at Café Largo when the singer said "this song is for you, or someone like you". They loved the phrase so much that they insisted on changing the album's title, despite the fact that 3,500 copies of the album with the original title had already been made. Their labels agreed, however the name change resulted in the album's release being delayed.

The album sold a mere 610 copies in its first week, but eventually went on to sell several million copies in the United States. Yourself or Someone Like You became one of the few albums to achieve the prestigious Diamond certification, and it was also certified multi-platinum in Australia, Canada and New Zealand. To date, the album has sold more than 15 million copies worldwide.

Artwork lawsuit
In 2005, almost a decade after the album's release, the band was sued by Frank Torres, the man on the album's cover. Torres claimed the band never asked for his permission to use his image on the sleeve. In the litigation, Torres claimed the photo was taken as he was walking down the street after being asked to pose. He also claimed the photo had caused him emotional distress. Torres justified the delay in suing Matchbox 20 by claiming he had first seen the album photo within two years of the litigation. Torres died in 2016 at age 73.

Track listing

Original release

Australian limited edition bonus CD

Personnel

Matchbox 20
Rob Thomas – lead vocals; acoustic guitar on "Hang"
Kyle Cook – lead guitar, backing vocals, co-lead vocals on "Hang"
Adam Gaynor – rhythm guitar, backing vocals
Brian Yale – bass
Paul Doucette – drums

Additional musicians
Matt Serletic – keyboards, percussion
Elizabeth Burkhardt – bassoon and woodwind leader on "Back 2 Good"
Amy Porter – flute on "Back 2 Good"
Yvonne Powers – oboe on "Back 2 Good"
Ted Gurch – clarinet on "Back 2 Good"
Douglas Smith – bass clarinet on "Back 2 Good"

Production
Matt Serletic – producer, mixing engineer
Jeff Tomei – engineer
Travis McGehee - engineer/mixing engineer
John Nielsen – assistant engineer
Greg Archilla – mixing engineer
Malcolm Springer – assistant mixing engineer
Stephen Marcussen – mastering engineer
Don C. Tyler – digital editing
Tony Adams – drum tech
Craig Poole – guitar tech
Jan Smith – vocal coach
Valerie Wagner – art direction, graphic design
Katrin Thomas – photography
Chris Cuffaro – band photo

Charts

Weekly charts

Year-end charts

Decade-end charts

Certifications

See also
List of best-selling albums in Australia
List of best-selling albums in the United States

References

Matchbox Twenty albums
1996 debut albums
Atlantic Records albums
Albums produced by Matt Serletic